The following lists events that happened during 2013 in Brunei.

Events

April
 April 7 - Taiwan plans to expand a pier on one of the disputed Spratly Islands, parts of which are also claimed by Vietnam, Brunei, China, Malaysia and the Philippines, as the other claimants strengthen military deployment in the South China Sea.

October
 October 9 - The 25th Association of Southeast Asian Nations summit and 8th East Asia Summit are held in Brunei.

References

 
2010s in Brunei
Years of the 21st century in Brunei
Brunei
Brunei